Éric Berthier is a French animation director.

Berthier directed episode 5 onwards of TF1's The Bellflower Bunnies (French: La Famille Passiflore) based on the children's books by Geneviève Huriet, following the first four episodes which were directed by Moran Caouissin. Berthier also served as director of 2001's Prudence Petitpas, and 2004's Isegrim & Reineke.

References

External links

French animators
French animated film directors
French television directors
Living people
Year of birth missing (living people)